MARMOK-A-5 is an offshore electrical power generator that uses wave energy to create electricity. This device is a spar buoy installed in the maritime testing site Bimep, in the Bay of Biscay. It is the first grid-connected maritime generator in Spain, and one of the first in the world.

Developed by the Basque company Oceantec Energias Marinas inside the European project OPERA, it is delivering electrical energy to the grid since December 2016. The buoy is located in the ocean, 4 km from the coastline and is connected to the sea with a submarine electrical cable. With a nominal power of 30 kW, the principal aim of the MARMOK-A-5 device is obtaining results in the way of designing a new generation cost effective high power marine energy generator.

Principle 
The operation principle of MARMOK-A-5 is a point absorber OWC (Oscillating Water Column). The device is 5m in diameter and a length of 42m, 6m above the water. It has a weight of more than 80 tons. The buoy is floating in a 90m depth and is tied to the sea bed with a mooring system based on anchors. This wave energy converter has demonstrated its robustness surviving difficult environmental conditions with waves as big as 12m.

References

External links 

 

Wave energy converters